The 2021–22 Maryland Eastern Shore Hawks men's basketball team represented the University of Maryland Eastern Shore in the 2021–22 NCAA Division I men's basketball season. The Hawks, led by second-year head coach Jason Crafton, played their home games at the Hytche Athletic Center in Princess Anne, Maryland as members of the Mid-Eastern Athletic Conference. They finished the season 11–16, 6–8 in MEAC play to finish in a tie for sixth place. As the No. 6 seed in the MEAC tournament, they lost in the quarterfinals to North Carolina Central. The Hawks received an invite to the 2022 The Basketball Classic postseason tournament, formerly known as the CollegeInsider.com Tournament, where they lost in the first round at Coastal Carolina.

Previous season
The Hawks did not participate in the 2020–21 season due to the ongoing COVID-19 pandemic.

Roster

Schedule and results

|-
!colspan=12 style=| Non-conference regular season

|-
!colspan=9 style=| MEAC regular season

|-
!colspan=9 style=| MEAC tournament

|-
!colspan=9 style=| The Basketball Classic

Source

References

Maryland Eastern Shore Hawks men's basketball seasons
Maryland Eastern Shore Hawks
Maryland Eastern Shore Hawks men's basketball
Maryland Eastern Shore Hawks men's basketball
Maryland Eastern Shore